Florida Pier Scott-Maxwell (14 September 1883 - 6 March 1979) was a playwright, author and psychologist.

Biography
Florida Pier was born in Orange Park, Florida, and educated at home until the age of ten. She grew up in Pittsburgh, then moved to New York City at age 15 to become an actress. In 1910 she married John Maxwell Scott-Maxwell and moved to her husband's native Scotland, and lived in Baillieston House 6 miles east of Glasgow where she worked for women's suffrage and as a playwright.

They had four children: sons Stephen, Peter and Denis, and a daughter Hilary. The couple divorced in 1929 and she moved to London. In 1933 she studied Jungian psychology under Carl Jung and practised as an analytical psychologist in both England and Scotland. Her most famous book is The Measure of My Days (1968).

Scott-Maxwell died in Exeter, England on 6 March 1979.

Selected works
The Power of Ancestors (short story, 1906)
Musty, Dusty Mr. Cullender (short story, 1910)
Mrs Nolly's Real Self (short story, 1911)
The Flash-Point. A play in three acts.  1914
The Kinsmen Knew How to Die (as "Florida Pier", with Sophie Botcharsky, 1931).
Pray for the Princess (short story, 1931)
Many Women (play) 1932. Produced at the Arts Theatre, London.
Towards relationship (non-fiction) 1939
I Said to Myself (play) 1946. Produced at the Mercury Theatre, London
Women and Sometimes Men (non-fiction) 1957 
The Measure of My Days (autobiography) 1968

References

1883 births
1979 deaths
American expatriates in the United Kingdom
American suffragists
20th-century American dramatists and playwrights
People from Orange Park, Florida
20th-century American women writers